The first season of La Voz Senior premiered July 15, 2019 on Azteca Uno. Ricardo Montaner, Yahir, Belinda and Lupillo Rivera were the coaches of this season, the same as for the eight season of La Voz. Jimena Pérez was the host.

When TV Azteca acquired rights of La Voz from Televisa, they announced that they would produce the senior version, for people 60 years and over. Mexico became the first country in Latin America to produce the senior version.

Coaches

Teams 
 Color key

Blind Auditions

Episode 1 (July 15)

Episode 2 (July 16)

Episode 3 (July 22)

Knockouts

The Final 

The Final Episode aired on Tuesday, July 30. In the first round all artists performed and, in the end, each coach picked one artist to advance to the second round. In this one, the four remaining artists performed twice (one new song and blind audition song). At the end of the night the first ever winner of La Voz Senior México was announced.

Ratings

References 

Mexico